Mario Góngora del Campo (June 22, 1915 – November 18, 1985) was a Chilean historian considered "one of the most important Chilean historians of the 20th century". Though his work he examined the history of the inquilinos, the encomentaderos, rural vagabonds and Indian Law (Derecho Indiano). He was in charge of university courses on medieval history.

In 1943 Góngora entered to work as teacher at the Pedagogy School (Escuela de Pedagogía) at the Pontifical Catholic University of Chile.  There he assisted Jaime Eyzaguirre in the History of Chile (Historia de Chile) classes. Most of the students of the time were priests, nuns and brothers.

Books published
 El estado en el derecho indiano: época de fundación (1492-1570), (1951)
 Evolución de la propiedad rural en el Valle de Puangue, (1956)
 Estudios sobre el galicanismo y la 'Ilustración Católica' en América española, (1957)
 Origen de los inquilinos de Chile Central, (1960) 
 Los grupos de conquistadores en tierra firme (1509-1530): fisonomía histórico-social de un tipo de conquista, (1962)
 Aspectos de la ilustración católica en el pensamiento y la vida eclesiástica chilena (1770-1814), (1969)
 Encomenderos y estancieros: estudios acerca de la constitución social aristocrática de Chile después de la conquista, 1580-1660, (1970)
 Estudios de historia de las ideas y de historia social, (1980)
 Ensayo histórico sobre la noción de Estado en Chile en los siglos XIX y XX, (1981) 
 Libertad política y concepto económico de gobierno en Chile hacia 1915-1935, (1986)
 Civilización de masas y esperanza y otros ensayos, (1987)
 Diario (2013)

References

1915 births
1985 deaths
20th-century Chilean historians
20th-century Chilean male writers
Legal historians
Social historians
Pontifical Catholic University of Chile alumni
University of Chile alumni
Academic staff of the University of Chile
Academic staff of the Pontifical Catholic University of Chile
Academic staff of the Pontifical Catholic University of Valparaíso